Isabel Webster is a British television presenter and newsreader, who currently co-hosts GB News Breakfast alongside  Eamonn Holmes. Until December 2017, Webster co-hosted Sunrise on Sky News, alongside Stephen Dixon.

Early life and education
Webster attended St George's College, Weybridge in Surrey before studying Politics and Theology at the University of Bristol, and gained a postgraduate diploma in Broadcast Journalism from City University.

Career
Webster presented and reported on the radio, for local, regional and national BBC News, before joining Sky News in 2011.

Webster joined Sky News as their West of England correspondent in 2011, covering stories including the floods, the trials of Ian Watkins and Vincent Tabak as well as the horsemeat scandal.

Webster began working with the national Sky News team in 2012. In early 2014, Webster joined Sky News' breakfast programme Sunrise, replacing Charlotte Hawkins. Her first episode was broadcast on 10 March 2014. She presented primarily on weekdays then transitioned to presenting Friday to Sunday until she left the programme in December 2017. She continued to work for Sky News, generally presenting Friday 2 pm till 5 pm plus Saturday and Sunday 5 pm till 8 pm, and various other shifts including Sky News at Ten and Sky News Today during holidays and absence. On 24 May 2021, Webster announced on her Instagram she had left Sky News. She joined GB News to co-host a weekly news review programme.

Webster now presents the Breakfast Show on GB News 'Breakfast with Eamonn Holmes and Isabel Webster'.

Personal life
Webster is married to Liam Pearce. The couple have two children.

References

External links
 Official website

Living people
People educated at St George's College, Weybridge
Alumni of the University of Bristol
Alumni of City, University of London
British television presenters
Sky News newsreaders and journalists
GB News newsreaders and journalists
Year of birth missing (living people)